Luohan Temple, may refer to:

 Luohan Temple (Chongqing), in Yuzhong District of Chongqing, China
 Luohan Temple (Shifang), in Shifang, Sichuan, China
 Luohan Temple (Chengdu), in Chengdu, Sichuan, China
 Luohan Temple, in Suzhou, Jiangsu, China
 Luohan Temple (Henan), in Gongyi, Henan, China